Arctacaridae is a small family of mites in the order Mesostigmata. These mites were discovered and described by Evans in 1955 in the arctic regions of North America.

Species
Arctacaridae contains two genera, with six recognized species:

 Genus Arctacarus Evans, 1955
 Arctacarus rostratus Evans, 1955
 Arctacarus beringianus Bregetova, 1977
 Arctacarus dzungaricus Bregetova, 1977
 Genus Proarctacarus Makarova, 2003
 Proarctacarus canadensis Makarova, 2003
 Proarctacarus johnstoni Makarova, 2003
 Proarctacarus oregonensis Makarova, 2003

References

Mesostigmata
Acari families